Mihály Rusovszky (1894 – July 1979) was a Hungarian cyclist. He competed in the individual time trial event at the 1924 Summer Olympics.

References

External links
 

1894 births
1979 deaths
Hungarian male cyclists
Olympic cyclists of Hungary
Cyclists at the 1924 Summer Olympics
Place of birth missing